Carrie Jones may refer to:

Carrie Jones (author)
Carrie Jones (footballer)